The Wolf Hunters is a 1926 American silent Western film, also classified as a Northern, directed by Stuart Paton and starring Robert McKim, Virginia Brown Faire and Mildred Harris. It is based on the 1908 novel The Wolf Hunters by James Oliver Curwood.

Cast
 Robert McKim as Ainsworth
 Virginia Brown Faire as Minnetaki
 Alan Roscoe as Sergeant Steve Drew
 Mildred Harris as Helen Ainsworth
 David Torrence as Le Grange
 Al Ferguson as Cleave
 Carroll Nye as Roderick Drew
 Joe de la Cruz as Woomba

References

Bibliography
 Langman, Larry. A Guide to Silent Westerns. Greenwood Publishing Group, 1992.

External links
 

1926 films
1926 Western (genre) films
1920s English-language films
American black-and-white films
American silent feature films
Rayart Pictures films
Films directed by Stuart Paton
Silent American Western (genre) films
Films set in Canada
Northern (genre) films
1920s American films